Engine Company No. 3 is located in Hoboken, Hudson County, New Jersey, United States. The firehouse was designed by Fagan & Briscoe and was built in 1915. The firehouse was added to the National Register of Historic Places on March 30, 1984. The firehouse serves as the headquarters for the Hoboken Fire Department, but houses no fire companies.

See also
National Register of Historic Places listings in Hudson County, New Jersey

References

Buildings and structures in Hoboken, New Jersey
Fire stations completed in 1915
Fire stations on the National Register of Historic Places in New Jersey
National Register of Historic Places in Hudson County, New Jersey
Defunct fire stations in New Jersey
New Jersey Register of Historic Places